Jacques-Germain Chaudes-Aigues (7 February 1814 – 26 January 1847) was a French journalist and writer.

Biography 
Born in Santhià (Piémont), Chaudes-Aigues studied in Turin then Grenoble and arrived in Paris in 1832. He then entered the Chronique de Paris directed by Honoré de Balzac and Gustave Planche. A literary, dramatic and musical critic, he collaborated in numerous newspapers such as L’Artiste, the Revue de Paris, La Presse, Le Siècle, La Revue du XIXe siècle, Les Français peints par eux-mêmes, La Galerie des Artistes dramatiques, L’Époque and Le Courrier français.

In 1838, he covered in London, the coronation of Victoria as new Queen of the United Kingdom for L'Artiste.

One of Balzac's detractors, he left an important correspondence with personalities of the 19th century such as Sainte-Beuve, François Buloz, Alexandre Dumas, and Charles Baudelaire.

He died in Paris on 26 January 1847.

Works 
1834: Élisa de Rialto, U. Canel
1835: Le bord de la coupe, at Werdet
1836: Sous le froc. Le Chartreux, with Maurice Alhoy, Werdet
1841: Les écrivains modernes de la France, 
1841: Alfred de Musset

Bibliography 
 Charles Louandre, Félix Bourquelot, La littérature française contemporaine: XIXe siècle, 1846, (p. 604) (Read online)
 Ludovic Lalanne, Dictionnaire historique de la France, 1872, (p. 514)
 Maurice Regard, L'Adversaire des romantiques: Gustave Planche 1808-1857,. 1956, (p. 205)

References

External links 
 Autographs by Jacques-Germain Chaudes-Aigues
 Jacques-Germain Chaudes-Aigues on IdRef

19th-century French journalists
French literary critics
French theatre critics
French music critics
1814 births
1847 deaths
People from Santhià